The economy of Quebec is diversified and post-industrial with an average potential for growth. It is highly integrated with the economies of the rest of Canada and the United States. Manufacturing and service sectors dominate the economy. If Quebec were a country, its economy would be ranked the 28th largest in the world just behind Thailand.

The economic heart of Quebec is the Montreal metropolitan area where half of Quebecers live. This region alone accounts for 53.4% of the province's gross domestic product (GDP), followed by the Quebec City metropolitan area (11.4%), Gatineau (3.2%), Sherbrooke (2.2%), Saguenay (1.9%) and Trois-Rivières (1.8%). In total, Quebec's GDP at market prices was CAD 380.9 billion or 19.0% of Canada's GDP.

For the 2022-2023 period, Quebec's budget was C$22 billion. This budget planned to provide $8,9 billion more to the healthcare sector over 5 years. The economy of Quebec represents 20.36% of the total GDP of Canada. Like most industrialized countries, the economy of Quebec is based mainly on the services sector. Quebec's economy has traditionally been fuelled by abundant natural resources, a well-developed infrastructure, and average productivity. The provincial GDP in 2021 was C$504,5 billion, making Quebec the second largest economy in Canada.

The provincial debt-to-GDP ratio peaked at 50.7% in fiscal year 2012–2013, is now resting at 39.9 in 2020, and is projected to decline to 33.8% in 2023–2024. The credit rating of Quebec is currently Aa2 according to the Moody's agency. In June 2017, Standard & Poor's (S&P) rated Quebec as an AA- credit risk, surpassing Ontario for the first time.

Quebec's economy has undergone tremendous changes over the last decade. Firmly grounded in the knowledge economy, Quebec has one of the highest growth rate of GDP in Canada. The knowledge sector represents about 30.9% of Quebec's GDP. In 2011, Quebec experienced faster growth of its research-and-development (R&D) spending than other Canadian provinces. Quebec's spending in R&D in 2021 was equal to C$4.1B or, above the European Union average of 1.84% and will have to reaches the target of devoting 3% of GDP to research and development activities in 2013 according to the Lisbon Strategy. The percentage spent on research and technology is the highest in Canada and higher than the averages for the Organisation for Economic Co-operation and Development and the G7 countries. Approximately 1.1 million Quebecers work in the field of science and technology.

Economic policies

Environmental and energy policy

Since 2006, Quebec has a green plan in order to achieve the objective of the Kyoto protocol on climate change. The Ministère du Développement durable, de l'Environnement et des Parcs du Québec (Ministry of Sustainable Development, Environment and Parks) is primarily responsible for implementing environmental policy. For its part, the Société des établissements de plein air du Québec (SEPAQ) is the lead agency for the management of national parks and wildlife reserves. Quebec currently protects nearly 8.12% (135,326 km2) of its territory. The first protected area was the creation of Mt. Royal Park in 1876 followed by the Mont-Tremblant National Park in 1894.

The Quebec government has been working to introduce the electric car since 1994, including contributing financing for technologies such as the TM4 MФTIVE, an electric motor designed and manufactured in Quebec. Hydro-Québec has recently tested more than 50 i-MiEV in order to gradually introduce the charging stations across the province. This is the largest pilot test of electric cars in Canada. Quebec was the first province in Canada to allow the ZENN car to drive on the roads. During the inaugural speech of 2011, Jean Charest announced five priorities for the next 30 years including the Plan Nord and called for a revolution in electric cars.

On November 23, 2009, Premier Jean Charest announced targets for reducing greenhouse gases during the United Nations Climate Change Conference in Copenhagen. Quebec will cut its emissions by 20% by the year 2020 compared to international reference of 1990. On January 14, 2010, a new law came into force to reduce greenhouse gases from automobiles which represent 40% of Quebec GHGs. This new law stipulates that car manufacturers serving the territory of Quebec must meet an emission ceiling of 187 grams of GHG/km or approximatively 7.7 L/100 km. This level must be reduced annually up to 127 grams of GHG/km or approximatively 5.3 L/100 km in 2016. These standards are as stringent as those in California (United States), according to the Government of Quebec. The provincial government plans to offer up to $8,000 rebate towards the purchase of an electric car. The government hopes that by 2020, a quarter of cars purchased in Quebec will be electric. The plan would position Quebec as a world leader in electrified transportation according to Jean Charest.
 
Quebec became the first region in North America to set a carbon tax. Since 2007, consumers pay a special tax on gasoline. Since July 2011, Quebec has imposed a carbon tax that affect more than 85% of industries in the province. This tax will be mandatory from 2013. The sectors affected by this carbon tax will have to reduce their carbon dioxide below 25 000 kilotonnes per year. Only the forest industry, agriculture and waste industries are not affected by this tax. In addition, the Quebec government plans to recover 60% of putrescible organic matter by 2015 in order to reduce its emissions. Quebec climate policy has been harshly criticised by the federal government under Prime minister Stephen Harper. In 2010, former minister Jim Prentice has openly criticized Quebec's plan to set GHG standards for motor vehicles sold in the province, describing it as "lunatic". However, ten months later, Prentice successor, John Baird, has praised Quebec as a world leader in GHG abatement.

Most productive sectors

Aerospace
There are some 260 companies of the aerospace sector that employ 40,000 people. It includes aerospace companies such as airplane manufacturer Bombardier, jet engine companies Pratt & Whitney and Rolls-Royce Canada, flight simulator builder CAE, defence contractor Lockheed Martin and L-3 Communications, and helicopter manufacturer Bell Helicopter. Various international organisations have established their headquarters in Quebec, notably the International Air Transport Association and the International Civil Aviation Organization.

Finance
The Finance, insurance, real estate and leasing industry employs 218,000 people, including the largest money manager in Canada, Caisse de dépôt et placement du Québec. The Bank of Montreal, founded in 1817 in Montreal, was Quebec's first bank but, like many other large banks, its central branch is now in Toronto. Several banks remain under Quebecois control, including the National Bank of Canada, the Desjardins Group and the Laurentian Bank.

Transportation
Quebec's ground transportation industry generated $7.2 billion in revenue at the beginning of 2004. It employs some 35,000 people and includes major original equipment manufacturers such as Bombardier, Paccar, Nova Bus, Prévost CAR, Komatsu International, and many suppliers and sub-contractors.

Quebec has eight deepwater ports for merchandise shipping, and in 2003 9.7 million tons of merchandise was carried by 3,886 cargo ships through the Saint Lawrence Seaway. The income created by this traffic is over $90 million per annum.

The Port of Montreal is the second biggest container handling port in Canada. Located on one of the largest navigable rivers in the world, the Saint Lawrence River, it is the third largest port in northeastern North America. Annual revenues of about $2 billion are created, along with 17,600 direct and indirect jobs.

Besides Montreal, other deepwater ports are located in Trois-Rivières and Bécancour, as well as in Sorel-Tracy, Baie-Comeau, Port-Cartier and Sept-Îles. The last four ports specialise in handling bulk cargo and heavy merchandise.

Information technology

Quebec's information technology employed over 100,000 workers in 2008. Of the total Canadian venture capital funding 52% is managed in Quebec with 61% of available funds invested in technology. Sectors of note include telecommunications, multimedia software, computer services and consulting, microelectronics and components. Its largest city, Montreal, is also a global hub for artificial intelligence research with many companies involved in this sector, such as Facebook AI Research (FAIR), Microsoft Research, Google Brain, DeepMind, Samsung Research and Thales Group (cortAIx).

Some 10,000 people work for 115 telecommunication companies such as Bell Canada, Ericsson, Motorola, and Mitec.

The multimedia sector was enhanced by Electronic Arts in 2003. Some 11,000 people work for game development companies such as Ubisoft, Microïds, Strategy First, A2M, and Eidos Interactive.

Montreal has two major creators of 3D animation software: Softimage and Autodesk Media and Entertainment Division.

The computer services, software development, and consulting branch employs 60,000 specialized workers.

The microelectronics sector has 110 companies employing 12,900 people.

Optics and photonics
In 2004, some 8000 people were employed in the Quebec optics and photonics industries. Research-related jobs are concentrated chiefly in the seven Quebec City region research centres, while production operations are mostly located in the Greater Montreal area. Quebec counts some 20 businesses in the laser, optical fibre, image processing, and related sectors.

Biotechnology
Quebec has some 130 companies employing 4700 people in the biotechnology industry. Some of the companies with facilities include Pfizer, Novartis and Merck-Frosst

Health industry
With 381 companies and 24,550 employees in the pharmaceutical, research and development, manufacturing, and related sectors, the Quebec health industry is one of the most important economic stimuli of modern Quebec. With the presence of some 20 multinationals such as Merck, Johnson & Johnson, Pfizer, Aventis, Novartis, Valeant, Galderma. GlaxoSmithKline and Bristol-Myers Squibb, Montreal ranks eighth in North America for the number of jobs in the pharmaceutical sector.

Tourism

Tourism plays an important role in the economy of Quebec. Tourism represents 2.5% of Quebec's GDP and nearly 400,000 people are employed in the tourism sector. Nearly 30,000 businesses are related to this industry, of which 70% are located outside of Montreal and Quebec City. In 2011, Quebec welcomed 26 million foreign tourists, most of them from the United States, France, the United Kingdom, Germany, Mexico and Japan.

The province of Quebec has 22 tourist regions, each of which presents its geography, its history and culture. The capital, Quebec City, is the only fortified city in North America and has its own European cachet. The oldest Francophone city in North America, Quebec City was named a World Heritage Site by UNESCO in 1985 and has celebrated its 400th anniversary in 2008. Montreal is the only Francophone metropolis in North America and also the second largest Francophone city after Paris in terms of population. This major centre of 4 million inhabitants is a tapestry of cultures from the world over with its many neighbourhoods, including Chinatown, the Latin Quarter, the Gay Village, Little Italy, Le Plateau-Mont-Royal, the Quartier International and Old Montreal. Montreal has a rich architectural heritage, along with many cultural activities, sports events and festivals.

The province of Quebec has over 400 museums including the Musée des beaux-arts de Montréal, which is the oldest museum in Canada and one of the most important art institutions. It is Montreal's largest museum and is amongst the most prominent in Canada.

Quebec is also a religious tourism destination. The Basilique Sainte-Anne-de-Beaupré and Oratoire Saint-Joseph du Mont-Royal are the most popular religious site in the province. In 2005, the Oratory was added to the List of National Historic Sites of Canada on the occasion of its 100th anniversary. Quebec has over 130 church and Cathedrals. All of which bear witness to the many origins that colonized the region.

In 2003, tourism-related expenditures amounted to C$7.3 billion. Some 27.5 million trips were made in Quebec, 76% of which were made by Quebecers themselves, 13% by other Canadians, 8% from the United States and 3% from other countries. Almost 330,000 people are employed in the tourism sector, working in over 34,000 businesses. Quebec is listed among the top 20 best tourist destinations in the world, and the City of Quebec is the only fortified city in North America north of Mexico.

The most visited cities are Montreal and Quebec City, although a sizeable number also visit the city of Gatineau in the west, which forms part of the federal National Capital Region (Ottawa).

Energy
Unlike most other regions of the world, Quebec stands out for its use of renewable energy. In 2008, electricity (more than 99% of which came from renewable energy sources) ranked as the main form of energy used in Quebec (41.6%), followed by oil (38.2%) and natural gas (10.7%).

Quebec produces most of Canada's hydroelectricity and is the 2nd biggest hydroelectricity producer in the world (2019) Because of this, Quebec has been described as a potential clean energy superpower. In 2019, Quebec's electricity production amounted to 214 terawatt-hours (TWh), 95% of which comes from hydroelectric power stations, and 4.7% of which come from wind energy. Thermal electricity production is almost completely absent from Quebec, except for a few power stations exploiting forest biomass or diesel generators which supply some twenty remote communities.

The public company Hydro-Québec occupies a dominant position in the production, transmission and distribution of electricity in Quebec. Hydro-Québec operates 63 hydroelectric power stations and 28 large reservoirs; they guarantee a stable and flexible supply which adjusts according to demand. Because of the remoteness of Hydro-Québec's TransÉnergie division, with its main facilities located in James Bay and on the Côte-Nord, the TransÉnergie division operates the largest electricity transmission network in North America. Their network includes 34,361 km of lines and 17 interconnections with neighbouring markets, allowing for the export of 38.3 TWh in 2018 alone.

As Quebec has few significant deposits of fossil fuels, all hydrocarbons are imported. Refiners' sourcing strategies have varied over time and have depended on market conditions. In the 1990s, Quebec purchased much of its oil from the North Sea. Since 2015, it now consumes almost exclusively the crude produced in western Canada and the United States. Quebec's two active refineries (Valero's in Lévis, and Suncor's in Montreal) have a total capacity of 402,000 barrels per day, which is greater than local needs, which stood at 365,000 barrels per day in 2018. In 2021, an Ipsos poll found that 43% of Quebecers want their province to develop its own oil resources instead of continuing to import all the oil consumed in the province.

The natural gas consumed in Quebec arrives through the TC Energy transmission network. Since 2016, Quebec's main natural gas distributor, the Énergir company, has been getting its supply at the Dawn reception point in southwestern Ontario, instead of at its previous main source the Empress intersection in Alberta. This change has occurred because of an increase in the non-traditional production of shale gas in North America, stimulating competition between the different supply basins operated across the continent. In 2018, 86% of natural gas came from Dawn and 12% from Empress. The rest consists of injections of natural gas produced locally by the recovery of residual materials.

Agriculture

The combination of rich and easily arable soils and relatively warm climate make the St. Lawrence River Valley Quebec's most prolific agricultural area. Throughout the province, there are 29,380 farm enterprises and 42,265 farmers. It produces meat, dairy products, fruit, vegetables, foie gras,  (of which Quebec is the world's largest producer), fish, and livestock. In Quebec, agricultural land accounts for only 2% of the province's total land area. In France, the figure is 58%, whereas in the United States, it is 45%.

 face many pests and diseases. Among caterpillars the Bruce spanworm, Forest tent caterpillar, and Gypsy moth are most severe. Among fungal diseases the greatest impact is due to Eutypella canker (E. parasitica) and Nectria canker (N. galligena), and Armillaria ostoyae root disease, Hardwood Trunk Rot, and Tar spot are also significant.

The agri-food industry plays an important role in the economy of Quebec, with meat and dairy products being the two main sectors. It accounts for 8% of the Quebec's GDP and generates $19.2 billion. This industry generated 487,000 jobs in agriculture, fisheries, manufacturing of food, beverages and tobacco and food distribution. Quebec is in 1st place for the highest amount of milk produced and biggest amount of farms engaged in the dairy industry (2019). Animal production accounts for more than half of all farms in Quebec. Dairy production is the province's most important, accounting for 57% of farm enterprises and 26% of income. It is followed by hog production, which accounts for 15% of total revenue. The most major agricultural output is grain maize (for livestock).

Quebec's exports of food products increased by 75% between 1999 and 2002, reaching $3.6 billion. In 2002, more than 150 countries imported these products, 88% of them with three partners: the United States (75.1%), the European Union (5.5%) and Japan (7.4%). The most exported products are pork, various food preparations, and various agricultural and food products.

Quebec sells its products to the Eastern and Asian markets in such large quantities that China is now the second country (after the United States) that imports the most Quebec products with 4% of Quebec exports.

In Quebec, agricultural activities generated $9.1 billion in product sales revenue. The regions of Montérégie (30%), Chaudière-Appalaches (18%), and Centre-du-Québec (14%), account for 61% of total revenue.

 are grown here, the highest for any province or territory. APFFdQ recommends cultivars for the province:

For  varieties APFFdQ recommends Boyne, Killarney, Festival, Nova, Tulameen, Pathfinder, Polana.

Forestry
North of the St. Lawrence River Valley, the territory of Quebec has significant resources in its coniferous forests, lakes, and rivers. These include pulp, paper, and lumber. More than half of Quebec (nearly 900,000 km2) is covered in forests, a size nearly twice that of Sweden.

The pulp and paper industry generates annual shipments valued at more than $14 billion. The forest products industry ranks second in exports, with shipments valued at almost $11 billion. It is also the main, and in some circumstances only, source of manufacturing activity in more than 250 municipalities in the province. The forest industry has slowed in recent years because of the softwood lumber dispute. This industry employs 68,000 people in several regions of Quebec. This industry accounted for 3.1% of Quebec's GDP. In 2020, it accounted for 8% of Quebec's exports, nearly $12 billion of forest products each year, the second largest amount of any province.

In 2021, a study concluded that only 1% of Quebec's forests are harvested each year.

Mining
Québec has immense mining potential, and in 2021, it was the second highest mineral-producing province by value at $11.9 billion, coming second to British Columbia ($12.9 billion). The Abitibi also has the world’s largest Archean volcano-sedimentary belt and is known for its gold, copper, zinc, and silver resources. Québec develops 17 metals and 12 nonmetals, giving it Canada’s most diverse resource base. Without including corporate income tax, the Québec government received $1.3 billion in 2018, while the Government of Canada received an extra $500 million through mining activities.

Approximately 30 minerals are mined, with the most important being iron, gold, nickel, titanium, niobium, zinc, copper, silver, and stone. In 2010, the province was the largest producer of zinc in Canada and the second largest producer of gold and iron. The province is also the world's second-largest producer of niobium and the third of titanium dioxide. The province's first diamond mine is scheduled to commence operations in 2016. The province has 27 mines, around 200 exploration firms, and 12 primary processing plants. In 2010 the value of mineral shipments from the province was about $6.8 billion.

Imports and exports

Quebec exported C$ 98 billion in 2021, making it Canada's third highest exporter out of 13 exporters. Fixed wing aircraft, unladen weight (C$ 5.36B), aluminium unwrought, not alloyed (C$ 4.64B), aluminium unwrought, alloyed (C$ 4.24B), iron ore, concentrate, not iron pyrites, unagglomerate (C$ 4.22B), and wood; coniferous species, other than of... (C$ 2.65B) were Quebec's top exports in 2021.

In 2021, Canada's Quebec imported C$ 87.5B, making it the 2nd largest importer out of the 13 importers in Canada. In 2021 top imports of Quebec were Petroleum oils, oils from bituminous minerals,... (C$ 4.57B), Other Aircraft parts (C$ 2.76B), Parts of turbo-jet or turbo-propeller engines (C$ 2.28B), Petroleum spirit for motor vehicles (C$ 2.18B), and Medicaments nes, in dosage (C$ 1.83B).

In November 2022, Quebec exported mostly to United States (C$6.68B), China (C$309M), France (C$222M), Mexico (C$143M), and Germany (C$136M), and imported mostly from United States (C$3.06B), China (C$1.16B), Italy (C$378M), Germany (C$366M), and Brazil (C$309M).

The North American Free Trade Agreement (NAFTA), grants Quebec, among other things, the access to a market of 130 million consumers within . With the World Trade Organization (WTO) and the NAFTA, Quebec is increasing its ability to compete internationally. Following these agreements, trade relations with other countries were boosted. As a result, Quebec has seen its exports increase significantly.

Exports for the year 2022 were 4.5% higher than in 2021

Approximately 85% of Quebec exports are destined for the United States. Economic relations between Quebec and France are important: in 2008, approximately 17,000 Quebecers are employed in 470 French companies in Quebec, and 26,000 French people work in 154 Quebec companies in France.

Several prominent Quebec companies work within the international market: Cascades and AbitibiBowater pulp and paper producers, Agropur milk producer, Bombardier transport manufacturer, CGI information technologies, Cirque du Soleil circus, Couche-Tard convenience stores, Garda security, Énergir power distributor, Cossette marketing firm, Quebecor media and telecommunications, Raymond Chabot Grant Thornton accounting firm, Saputo dairy and food company, Vachon bakery, SNC-Lavalin engineering and construction group, Molson brewery, and many more.

See also

 Quebec
 Quiet Revolution
 Economy of Canada
 Economy of Ontario
 Canada's Global Markets Action Plan
 Free trade agreements of Canada

References

Further reading
 Coleman, William D. "The Political Economy of Quebec." in Wallace Clement and Glen Williams, eds. The New Canadian Political Economy.  (McGill-Queen's UP, 1989) pp. 160–79.
 Haddow, Rodney. Comparing Quebec and Ontario: Political Economy and Public Policy at the Turn of the Millennium (University of Toronto Press 2015) online review
 Polese, Mario. "Quebec's Entrepreneurial Revolution and the Reinvention of Montreal: Why and How It Happened." AEI Paper & Studies (American Enterprise Institute, 2020) online

External links
 Quebec's Institut de la statistique